Upper marsyangdi A Hydroelectric Station is a run-of-river hydro-electric plant located in Bhulbhule of Lamjung district of western Nepal. The flow from Marshyangdi River is used to generate 50 MW electricity. The energy is evacuated by a 25 km long, 132 kv single circuit transmission line from Bhulbhule (powerhouse) to Middle Marsyangdi Hydropower Project.

The project construction started in October 2012 and was expected to be completed in December 2015, but it was delayed due to the earthquake last year and the Indian blockade. First turbine was installed on 25 September 2016. The second turbine was added on 23 December 2016. It is the first project to use a vortex type settling basin.

Funding
It is the first project in Nepal built with foreign direct investment from China.
The project was developed by Joint venture of Power China Resources Ltd and Sino-Sagarmatha Power Company Nepal. Sino-Sagarmatha owns 10% share. Power China Resources Ltd, which holds 90% share, used 75% loan and 25% equity for the project. The project's payback period is 10 years. Nepal Electricity Authority buys the energy at 0.05999 USDollars per unit from this project.

Environment concerns
Since the Marshyangi river is popular for rafting, the construction of the dam has dried up the downstream stretch that has disrupted the rafting and fishing in this area.

See also
Marsyangdi Hydropower Station (another 69 MW station in the same river)
Middle Marsyangdi Hydropower Station (70 MW)

External links
Website of Sagarmatha Power Company

References

Hydroelectric power stations in Nepal
Gravity dams
Run-of-the-river power stations
Dams in Nepal
Buildings and structures in Lamjung District